Turn On the Lights is the fourth studio album by Canadian singer-songwriter Daniel Powter. The album was released in the United Kingdom on 13 July 2012. The album only entered the UK Albums Chart at number 109. It includes the singles "Cupid" and "Crazy All My Life". It features re-recordings of the three new songs (the other was "Lose To Win" already released as a single previously) from Powter's greatest hits album "Best of Me". They were "Come Back Home" (Originally titled "Come Home"), "The Day We Never Met" (Originally titled "Fall In Love (The Day We Never Met)")and a re-recording of the new version of "Best of Me", consisting of a brand new backing arrangement and a slightly different tune. On September 5, 2013, Powter later released 4 new songs as bonus tracks for his album Turn on the Lights called Ur My Radio, Doesn't Matter, Cheers To Us and Goodbye.

Singles
 "Cupid" was released as the lead single from the album on 10 April 2012. The single peaked to number 195 on the UK Singles Chart.
 "Crazy All My Life" McDonough Management uploaded a lyric video to YouTube on 23 August 2012. The official video was filmed while Powter was on tour and then uploaded to YouTube on his official channel on 27 March 2013.

Track listing

Chart performance

Release history

References

2012 albums
Daniel Powter albums
Avex Group albums
Albums produced by Howard Benson